Tilt-A-Whirl is an amusement park ride.

Tilt-A-Whirl may also refer to:

Arcwelder, a band originally named Tilt-A-Whirl
Tilt-a-Whirl (novel), a book by Chris Grabenstein
Tilt-a-whirl, a professional wrestling hold
Tilt-a-whirl backbreaker
Tilt-a-whirl headscissors takedown

See also
Tilt O'Whirl, a 1999 music album by Veal